Cumbia refers to a number of musical rhythms and folk dance traditions of Latin America, generally involving musical and cultural elements from American Indigenous peoples, enslaved Africans during colonial times, and Europeans. It is said to have come from funeral traditions in the Afro-Colombian community.

The sound of cumbia can be characterized as having a simple "chucu-chucu-chu" created by the guacharaca. The genre frequently incorporates brass instruments and piano.

Examples of cumbia include:

 Colombian cumbia, is a musical rhythm and traditional folk dance from Colombia. It has elements of three different cultures, American Indigenous, African, and Spanish, being the result of the long and intense meeting of these cultures during the Conquest and the Colony. The Colombian cumbia is the origin of all the other variations, including the tradition of dancing it with candles in the dancers' hands. 
 Panamanian cumbia, Panamanian folk dance and musical genre, developed by enslaved people of African descent during colonial times and later syncretized with American Indigenous and European cultural elements.

Regional adaptations of Colombian cumbia

Argentina
 Argentine cumbia
 Cumbia villera, a subgenre of Argentine cumbia born in the slums
 Fantasma, a 2001 group formed by Martín Roisi and Pablo Antico
 Cumbia santafesina, a musical genre emerged in Santa Fe, Argentina

Bolivia
 Bolivian cumbia

Chile
 Chilean cumbia
 New Chilean cumbia

Costa Rica
 Costa Rican cumbia

Ecuador
 Ecuadorian cumbia

El Salvador
 Salvadoran cumbia
 Cumbia marimbera, a subgenre of Cumbia that is widely popular in Southern Mexico and Central America

Guatemala
 Guatemalan cumbia
 Cumbia marimbera, a subgenre of Cumbia that is widely popular in Southern Mexico and Central America

Honduras
 Honduran cumbia
 Cumbia marimbera, a subgenre of Cumbia that is widely popular in Southern Mexico and Central America

Mexico
 Mexican cumbia
 Southeast cumbia or chunchaca, a variant of Mexican cumbia
 Northern Mexican cumbia, a variant of Mexican cumbia, developed in northeastern Mexico and part of Texas (former Mexican territory)
 Cumbia sonidera, a variant of Mexican cumbia
 Cumbia marimbera, a subgenre of Cumbia that is widely popular in Southern Mexico and Central America

Nicaragua
 Nicaraguan cumbia
 Cumbia chinandegana
 Cumbia marimbera, a subgenre of Cumbia that is widely popular in Southern Mexico and Central America

Panama
 Panamanian cumbia

Paraguay
 Cachaca, a fusion of cumbia sonidera, norteña, vallenato and cumbia villera

Peru
 Peruvian cumbia also known as chicha or psychedelic cumbia
 Chicha or Andean tropical music
 Amazonian cumbia or jungle cumbia, a popular subgenre of Peruvian cumbia, created in the Peruvian Amazon
 Cumbia piurana, a set of styles and sub-genres linked to cumbia that have been produced in Piura, a region on the north Peruvian coast, since the mid-1960s
 Cumbia sanjuanera, a subgenre of cumbia piurana
 Cumbia sureña, a subgenre of Peruvian cumbia, a fusion of Andean cumbia and techno

Uruguay
 Uruguayan cumbia

Venezuela
 Venezuelan cumbia

References